Renee Bracey Sherman is an American writer and abortion rights activist. She is the founder and executive director of the nonprofit We Testify.

Life and career 
Bracey Sherman was raised in the suburbs of Chicago. Her mother is African American and her father is white. Both of her parents were nurses.

She received her master of public administration degree from Cornell University.

Bracey Sherman is an abortion rights activist. She argues that abortion should be normalized, and connects anti-choice legislation to the criminalization of marginalized groups. She founded the organization We Testify in 2016, which provides a platform to share personal stories about abortion. One of her goals is to expand the diversity of voices in abortion storytelling. Her advocacy is related to her own experience getting an abortion at the age of 19. Bracey Sherman didn't share her decision with her parents for many years even though she was raised in a pro-choice family. 

She has criticized the pro-choice movement as exclusionary to women of color, and too moderate with slogans such as "safe, legal, and rare."

While testifying before the House Committee on Energy and Commerce in July 2022, she provided instructions on how to self-manage an abortion with mifepristone and misoprostol pills.

References

External links 
 Official website

Year of birth missing (living people)
Living people
21st-century African-American women
Activists from Illinois
Cornell University alumni
Reproductive rights activists